Pero Stojkić (born 9 December 1986) is a Bosnian retired professional footballer who played as a left-back.

Club career
He was the long-time captain of Bosnian Premier League club Zrinjski Mostar. Stojkić won five Bosnian Premier League titles with Zrinjski in the seasons 2004–05, 2013–14, 2015–16, 2016–17 and 2017–18. He announced his immediate retirement in January 2021 after making a club record of 257 official appearances for the club.

Honours
Zrinjski Mostar
Bosnian Premier League: 2004–05, 2013–14, 2015–16, 2016–17, 2017–18

References

External links
Pero Stojkić at Sofascore

1986 births
Living people
Sportspeople from Mostar
Croats of Bosnia and Herzegovina
Association football fullbacks
Bosnia and Herzegovina footballers
HŠK Zrinjski Mostar players
HNK Zmaj Makarska players
NK Osijek players
Premier League of Bosnia and Herzegovina players
Croatian Football League players
Bosnia and Herzegovina expatriate footballers
Expatriate footballers in Croatia
Bosnia and Herzegovina expatriate sportspeople in Croatia